Malcolm James Mackenzie (born 1 May 1950) is a Scottish former footballer who played eight games in the Football League for Port Vale as a teenager.

Career
He joined Port Vale as an amateur in November 1965, and made his debut at Vale Park against Newport County on 12 April 1966 at the age of 15 years 347 days, becoming the youngest ever first team player for the club. He played one further Fourth Division game under Jackie Mudie in 1965–66. He signed professional forms under Stanley Matthews in May 1967, and scored his first and only senior goal on 30 September, in a 4–2 home win over Workington. The 17-year-old finished the 1967–68 campaign with six appearances and one goal to his name. Despite this bright start to his career, Mackenzie was released in May 1968.

Career statistics
Source:

References

1950 births
Living people
Footballers from Edinburgh
Scottish footballers
Association football midfielders
Port Vale F.C. players
English Football League players